Eric Allen Ravotti (born March 16, 1971) is a former American football linebacker who played three seasons with the Pittsburgh Steelers of the National Football League (NFL). He was drafted by the Steelers in the sixth round of the 1994 NFL Draft. He played college football at Pennsylvania State University and attended Freeport Senior High School in Freeport, Pennsylvania.

External links
Just Sports Stats

Living people
1971 births
Players of American football from Pennsylvania
American football linebackers
Penn State Nittany Lions football players
Pittsburgh Steelers players
People from Freeport, Pennsylvania